Seth M. Siegel (born 1953) is an American businessman, writer, and activist. He is the author of the 2015 New York Times Best Seller, Let There Be Water: Israel's Solution for a Water-Starved World. He has also founded or co-founded several companies including, The Beanstalk Group and Sixpoint Partners. Additionally, Siegel has produced shows for Broadway and television, and his essays and articles have appeared in publications including The New York Times, Los Angeles Times, The Wall Street Journal, and others.

Early life and education
Siegel grew up in Queens, New York as the grandchild of Jewish immigrants. He attended Cornell University, graduating with a Bachelor of Science degree in 1974. After graduate studies at the Hebrew University of Jerusalem, Siegel returned to New York where he earned a Juris Doctor degree from Cornell Law School.

Career

In 1992, Siegel co-founded The Beanstalk Group, a trademark licensing and brand extension company. Clients of the company included Coca-Cola and Harley-Davidson, and AT&T. The company was sold to the Ford Motor Company in June 2001, and was, in turn, sold to the Omnicom Group in 2005.

Siegel served as a producer of the 2002 Broadway revival of Man of La Mancha, which was nominated for three Tony Awards including Best Revival of a Musical. He was also a producer of the ABC miniseries, Dinotopia, which received six Emmy Award nominations and won Outstanding Special Visual Effects for a Miniseries, Movie or a Special. In 2007, Siegel co-founded Sixpoint Partners, a financial services firm.

In 2015, St. Martin's Press published Siegel's book, Let There Be Water: Israel's Solution for a Water-Starved World, which detailed the ways in which Israel successfully implemented water management and conservation policies despite its arid climate. Let There Be Water became a New York Times, Los Angeles Times, and Washington Post best seller and has appeared in multiple foreign-language editions. Since the publication of Let There Be Water, Siegel has lectured on water themes around the world. He is also a member of the Council on Foreign Relations.

Bibliography

References

External links
Official website
TEDx, Israel's solution for a water-starved world by Seth Siegel
Can a Desert Nation Solve the World's Water Shortage? by Seth Siegel

1953 births
Living people
American male writers
Jewish American writers
Cornell University alumni
Cornell Law School alumni
Writers from New York City